Elizabeth Ehrlich (aka. Elizabeth Potok; born October 12, 1954) is an American author. Her works include Miriam's Kitchen: A Memoir (winner of a National Jewish Book Award) and a biography of Nellie Bly. She was born in Detroit, and currently lives in Westchester County, New York. She has also taught at Columbia University Graduate School of Journalism.

Notes

External links
New York Times review of Miriam's Kitchen

Living people
20th-century American memoirists
Writers from Detroit
1954 births
Jewish American writers
American biographers
Columbia University Graduate School of Journalism faculty
American women memoirists
American women biographers
American women novelists
20th-century American novelists
20th-century American women writers
Novelists from Michigan
21st-century American Jews
21st-century American women